FirstOntario Centre (originally Copps Coliseum) is a sports and entertainment arena at the corner of Bay Street North and York Boulevard in Hamilton, Ontario, Canada. Opened in 1985, it has a capacity of up to 19,000.

History
Hamilton was left without a large ice hockey venue after the Barton Street Arena was demolished in 1977, and even that arena had a small seating capacity by modern standards. Construction on the new site was started in 1983 and completed two years later at a cost of $33.5 million, with an additional $2.3 million spent on a parking garage. The project was overseen by Hamiltonian Joseph Pigott.
The arena was originally named Copps Coliseum after long-time mayor Victor Copps, the patriarch of a Hamilton political family that includes his daughter, former Member of Parliament of Canada and Member of Provincial Parliament of Ontario Sheila Copps, and wife, Geraldine, who was a long-time councillor.

The arena's first scoreboard was purchased from the Winnipeg Arena for $214,000.  That original Day Signs/Naden scoreboard, built in Toronto, was replaced in the early-1990s by a centre-hung scoreboard with an electronic message centre on each side, which, in return was replaced by the current scoreboard, which was built in Hamilton by Media Resources, featuring a LED video board on each side.

The arena has hosted many teams and events over the years. The Hamilton Steelhawks of the Ontario Hockey League (OHL) began play at the arena in 1985. The 1986 World Junior Ice Hockey Championships were held in Southern Ontario, with Copps Coliseum used as the primary venue. In a decisive game, the undefeated Soviet Union handed Canada its first loss, 4–1. Copps was the primary host for the 1987 Canada Cup, and the site of the famous Gretzky to Lemieux goal that beat the Soviets 6–5 in the final. The Dukes of Hamilton replaced the Steelhawks as the city's OHL team and played in Copps Coliseum from 1989 to 1991. The arena hosted the 1990 Memorial Cup and set the single game attendance record, on May 13, 1990, with 17,383 spectators watching the Oshawa Generals defeat the Kitchener Rangers, in the final, 4–3 in double overtime on a Bill Armstrong goal. The venue hosted a number of games in the 1991 Canada Cup, including the finals, when Canada defeated the United States.

The first WWF Royal Rumble, which was shown on the USA Network, was held in the arena on January 24, 1988. Copps hosted the WWF pay-per-view Breakdown: In Your House on September 27, 1998, and the Billy Graham crusade that year, attended by 19,000 spectators each night. The Grateful Dead played the Coliseum on five occasions, with two dates in 1990 and three dates in 1992.

In November 2022, it was announced that beginning in the late summer of 2023, the arena would close for 20 months due to renovations. This will force the Bulldogs and Rock to relocate for all of the 2023–24 season and most of the 2024–25 season. As a result of the closure, the Honey Badgers decided to permenantly relocate to Brampton, Ontario.

Basketball
The Hamilton Skyhawks debuted with a 101–99 win over the Halifax Windjammers in World Basketball League play, in 1992.  The league folded during the season, and several Canadian teams, including the Skyhawks formed the National Basketball League for 1993, but the 'Hawks moved to Edmonton for the playoffs, then folded.

The Coliseum was host to the 1994 FIBA World Championship, along with Maple Leaf Gardens and SkyDome.  The next year, the Centre hosted the FIBA Americas Championship for Women, which was won by Canada.  During their first two seasons of play (1995–96 and 1996–97), prior to the completion of construction on their new home the Air Canada Centre, the Toronto Raptors played three regular season games at Copps Coliseum, as well as a preseason game in 1997. In 1998 a strange twist of scheduling conflicts led the Toronto Raptors to play their final regular season game in Hamilton, as the Toronto Blue Jays had first right of refusal for all SkyDome dates. The Raptors had attempted to play the April 19 match at Maple Leaf Gardens, but were unsuccessful.

AHL and OHL
The American Hockey League expanded to Copps in 1992 in the form of Vancouver's affiliate, the Hamilton Canucks.  After two seasons, the team was moved to Syracuse, where they became one of the league's most stable franchises.

In October 1996, Copps Coliseum became home to the Hamilton Bulldogs of the American Hockey League. The Bulldogs, who were the top affiliate of the Edmonton Oilers (1996–2003) and the Montreal Canadiens (2002–2015), brought over 2 million fans to the arena. On June 7, 2007, the AHL Hamilton Bulldogs won their first Calder Cup Championship in franchise history at home in Copps Coliseum, defeating the Hershey Bears.

In 2015, Montreal moved its AHL affiliate to St. John's, and the Ontario Hockey League's Belleville Bulls moved to Hamilton to carry the Bulldogs banner, and Hamilton's traditional black and yellow colours, in the junior league. The Bulldogs are the primary tenant in the facility.

NHL ambitions
Copps Coliseum was built to National Hockey League capacity and specifications in the hope that it would allow Hamilton to acquire an NHL expansion franchise. However, the city is less than 50 miles from the home arenas of two NHL franchises, the Toronto Maple Leafs and Buffalo Sabres, both of which have opposed an NHL franchise in Hamilton. Hamilton's close proximity to Toronto and Buffalo has proven to be an obstacle to attracting a franchise; it did host eight regular-season neutral-site games during the 1992–93 and 1993–94 seasons, mostly featuring the Maple Leafs or Sabres.

In 2007, Waterloo billionaire Jim Balsillie, co-CEO of Research in Motion, made an offer to purchase the Nashville Predators for $220 million US.  His intention was to move the team to Hamilton and either use Copps Coliseum as a temporary home while a new state-of-the-art arena could be built, or to renovate the Coliseum to bring it up to modern NHL standards.  The bid was ultimately unsuccessful.  In the spring of 2009, the Phoenix Coyotes filed for bankruptcy and Jim Balsillie immediately offered a rumoured $212.5 million US, while stating he wanted to move the franchise to southwestern Ontario. Balsillie applied for a lease option which, should the relocation have succeeded, would have invoked a 20-year lease for the team to play at Copps Coliseum. On May 9, 2009, the Toronto Star, Hamilton Spectator and others reported that Hamilton mayor Fred Eisenberger was to meet with a second group interested in securing a lease. The group, led by Vancouver businessmen Tom Gaglardi and Nelson Skalbania, was interested in securing an interest in the Atlanta Thrashers and moving them to the Centre for the 2010–11 NHL season. The team ultimately moved to Winnipeg in 2011, becoming the second incarnation of the Winnipeg Jets instead.  On May 13, 2009, The Canadian Press reported on TSN.ca that Balsillie won the exclusive rights to Hamilton's Copps Coliseum until November after a unanimous vote by Hamilton city council.  On May 29, 2009, Balsillie unveiled his plans to renovate the Centre into a state-of-the-art facility in anticipation of a NHL franchise coming to Hamilton. It's unknown whether these renovations will come to fruition since Balsillie ultimately lost his bid to buy the Coyotes.

In 2008, it was announced that the Golden Horseshoe would be bidding for the 2015 Pan American Games.  On February 18, 2009, Copps Coliseum was identified as the proposed site for the volleyball competition for the Games, though it ultimately did not host any events.

On January 3, 2014, Nitro Circus performed at the stadium for the first ever and only stop in Canada. Due to the high-risk nature of their stunt-based shows, most North American venues will not host the events.

On January 27, 2014, Hamilton City council voted unanimously to approve a $3.5-million deal to rename Copps Coliseum after local credit union First Ontario.  The city unveiled the new look signage, FirstOntario Centre, later that spring. A smaller sign reading "In honour of Victor K. Copps" appears to its right on the Bay side of the arena, and below it on the York side.

Curling
In 2007, from March 3 to 11, Copps Coliseum hosted the Tim Hortons Brier, the annual Canadian men's curling championship. The Coliseum hosted the West 49 Canadian Open, from September 20 to October 1.

Images

See also
FirstOntario Concert Hall
Hamilton Convention Centre
Art Gallery of Hamilton
Lloyd D. Jackson Square
List of sports venues in Hamilton, Ontario
List of indoor arenas in Canada

References

External links

 
 OHL Arena Guide on FirstOntario Centre

1985 establishments in Ontario
Sports venues completed in 1985
Event venues established in 1985
Hamilton Bulldogs (AHL)
Indoor ice hockey venues in Ontario
Indoor lacrosse venues in Canada
Music venues in Ontario

Sports venues in Hamilton, Ontario
Toronto Raptors venues
Judo venues
Basketball venues in Ontario